Taiteilijaelämää (Finnish for "An Artist's Life") is the third solo album of Ismo Alanko, released in 1995. Alanko later used the same title for his 2006 DVD Taiteilijaelämää vuosilta 1989-2006.

Track listing 
Music and lyrics by Ismo Alanko.
 "Oletko koskaan..."—5:24
 "Pelataanko shakkia vai?"—5:08
 "Nuorena syntynyt"—6:12
 "Kamaan ja tavaraan"—3:50
 "Väärään maailmaan"—4:59
 "Don Quiote"—4:54
 "Kun rakkaus on rikki"—5:32
 "Pakko päästä pinnalle"—3:25
 "Taiteilijaelämää"—4:36
 "Suomi ratsastaa jälleen"—4:18
 "Tule mun luojani"—5:28
 "Kurjet"—4:39

Personnel 
 Ismo Alanko -- vocals, guitar, synthesizer
 Jukka Kiviniemi -- bass
 Ippe Kätkä -- drums, maracas
 Riku Mattila—guitar, slide guitar,  bass
 Safka -- organ, electric piano, piano
 Izmo—synthesizer
 Ilkka Alanko -- backing vocals
 Ona Kamu—backing vocals
 Sakari Kukkonen—drums, tambourine, backing vocals
 Tommi Lindell—synthesizer
 Pekka Witikka—synthesizer
 Max Savikangas -- viola
 Sanna Salmenkallio -- violin

Notes 

1995 albums
Ismo Alanko albums